Jean-Pierre Lebreton (born 21 August 1949, in Thimert-Gâtelles, France) is a French planetary scientist at ESA, specialized in plasma physics. He was the mission manager of the Huygens probe that landed on Saturn's moon Titan in 2005. Besides the Huygens mission, Lebreton is also working with the Rosetta comet probe and its Plasma Consortium Experiment, and the Venus Express space probe.

References

External links 
 Interview with Lebreton

1949 births
Living people
European Space Agency personnel
Planetary scientists